Mongolia is a landlocked unitary sovereign state in East Asia. Economic activity in Mongolia has traditionally been based on herding and agriculture, although development of extensive mineral deposits of copper, coal, molybdenum, tin, tungsten, and gold have emerged as a driver of industrial production. Besides mining (21.8% of GDP) and agriculture (16% of GDP), dominant industries in the composition of GDP are wholesale and retail trade and service, transportation and storage, and real estate activities. The grey economy is estimated to be at least one-third the size of the official economy. , 68.4% of Mongolia's exports went to the PRC, and the PRC supplied 29.8% of Mongolia's imports.

For further information on the types of business entities in this country and their abbreviations, see "Business entities in Mongolia".

Notable firms 
This list includes notable companies with primary headquarters located in the country. The industry and sector follow the Industry Classification Benchmark taxonomy. Organizations which have ceased operations are included and noted as defunct.

See also 
 List of companies listed on the Mongolian Stock Exchange

References 

Mongolia